Omethes is a genus of false soldier beetles in the family Omethidae. There are at least two described species in Omethes.

Species
 Omethes rugiceps (Lewis, 1895)
 Omethes marginatus LeConte, 1861

References

Further reading

 

Elateroidea
Articles created by Qbugbot